Alexandre Iracà is a Canadian politician in Quebec, who served in the National Assembly of Quebec for the riding of Papineau from 2012 to 2018. He was first elected in the 2012 election.

References

1970 births
Living people
Quebec Liberal Party MNAs
Lawyers in Quebec
University of Ottawa alumni
21st-century Canadian politicians
People from Val-d'Or
Politicians from Gatineau